Itapúa Poty is a district in the Itapúa Department of Paraguay. Its name translates to "Flower of Itapúa".

The district has a total of 20,866 inhabitants;  Of this total, only 601 inhabitants are in the urban area of ​​the district, the rest of the population is in the rural area.  Its inhabitants;  composed mostly of descendants of foreign immigrants;  Germans, Poles and Brazilians;  which is why, in rural communities, it is not uncommon to find a foreign accent that differs from what is seen in other areas of the country

Sources 
World Gazeteer: Paraguay – World-Gazetteer.com

Districts of Itapúa Department